Chris Northrop is an American actor. He is best known for playing the recurring role Meth-Head Charlie in the Netflix Original Series Unbreakable Kimmy Schmidt.  TV credits include Gotham, Law & Order: SVU, Ugly Betty, The Mysteries of Laura, What Would You Do?, Broad City and High Maintenance.  Northrop has also appeared in the feature films Unbreakable Kimmy Schmidt: Kimmy vs the Reverend, Baked in Brooklyn and Camp Hell.

Filmography

References

External links
 

Year of birth missing (living people)
Living people
American male film actors
American male television actors